Alise Rose Willoughby (née Post, born January 17, 1991) is an American professional "Current School" Bicycle Motocross (BMX) racer who has been racing competitively since 2002. She uses the moniker of "The Beast".

Racing career milestones

Note: Professional firsts are on the national level unless otherwise indicated.

Started racing: In 1997 at the age of six. Her brother raced and suggested that she try it.

First race result: Backed out of racing at the last minute. She looked down the steep starting hill and couldn't bring herself to do it. After overcoming her sense of nerves the next week she placed second in her second attempt at racing.

Turned Professional/Elite:* Professional during the third week of January 2006 at 15 years of age.

First Professional race result: Third place on day 1 in the American Bicycle Association Winternationals in Phoenix, Arizona, on April 1, 2006. She came in third as well the next day.

First Professional win: At the ABA Supernationals in Desoto, Texas, on May 7, 2006 (Day 2).

Career factory and major bike shop sponsors
Note: This listing only denotes the racer's primary sponsors. At any given time a racer could have numerous ever changing co-sponsors. Primary sponsorships can be verified by BMX press coverage and sponsor's advertisements at the time in question. When possible exact dates are given.

Amateur
Fly: 2000
Staats/TBS: 2001-September 2003
Avent/Bombshell: September 2003-November 2004
Hyper Bicycles: November 2004-December 3, 2005
CMC (Construction Management Consultants)  Inc.: Early December 2005-December 17, 2006 Post would turn pro with this sponsor.

Professional
CMC Inc.: Early December 2005-December 17, 2006
Formula Bicycle Company/Monster Factory: December 18, 2006 – December 31, 2008
Redline Bicycles: January 1, 2009 – March 23, 2017
GW Bicycles: March 24, 2017–present

Career bicycle motocross titles
Note: Listed are District, State/Provincial/Department, Regional, National, and International titles in italics. Depending on point totals of individual racers, winners of Grand Nationals do not necessarily win National titles. Only sanctioning bodies active during the racer's career are listed. Series and one off Championships are also listed in block.

Amateur
National Bicycle League (NBL)

American Bicycle Association (ABA)
20 inch:
1999,'00,'01,'02,'03,'04 Minnesota District 6 (MN-06) No.1
1999,'00,'02,'03,'04 Minnesota State Champion
2000,'01,'02,'03,'04 Central Region Redline Cup Champion
2000 9 Girls National Age Group (NAG) No.1
2000 9 Girls Race of Champions (ROC) Champion
2001 10 Girls NAG No.1
2002 11 Girls NAG No.1
2002 11 Girls ROC Champion
2002 11 Girls Grandnational Champion
2002 Girls National No.2
2003 12 Girls World Champion
2003 12 Girls NAG No.1
2003 12 Girls ROC Champion
2003 12 Girls Grandnational Champion
2003 Girls National No.2
2004 13 Girls NAG No.1
2004 13 Girls ROC Champion
2001,'04 National No.1 Girl
Cruiser:
2000,'01,'02,'03,'04 Cruiser Minnesota District 6 (MN-06) No.1
2002,'03'04 Minnesota State Cruiser Champion
2000,'01 10 & Under Girls Cruiser Redline Cup Central Region Champion
2002,03,'04 11-13 Girls Cruiser Central Regional Redline Cup Champion
2001 10 & Under National Age Group (NAG) Girls Cruiser No.1
2002,'03,'04 11-13 National Age Group (NAG) Girls Cruiser No.1
2002,'03 Race of Champions Cruiser Champion.2003,'04 National No.1 Girl CruiserUnion Cycliste Internationale (UCI)2001,'02,'03,'04 World Champion2001,'04 Cruiser World Champion2007 15-16 Girls Cruiser World ChampionProfessional
National Bicycle League (NBL)
None
American Bicycle Association (ABA)2006,'07 National No.1 Pro WomenUnion Cycliste Internationale (UCI)*2017, 2019 Elite Women World ChampionUSA Cycling2010 Elite Women Second Place National ChampionPro Series Championships and Invitationals

Notable accolades
2016 Olympic silver medalist in BMX in Rio
2012 U.S.A. Olympic Team Coach's Pick, she will represent U.S.A. in the Women's BMX Cycling event at the 2012 Summer Olympics in London, United Kingdom.
She was voted 2006 Rookie Pro of the Year by the readers of BMXer magazine, the ABA's official publication. She is the first female to win the title.
At 15 years of age, she was the youngest female to hold the National No.1 Pro Women's title. She is also one of the youngest to turn pro female or male in BMX since the early days of the professional class of the late 1970s. She is also one of the youngest to hold a pro title since that era.
She was also the first female to earn all three Girls division classifications that have existed: No.1 Girl Amateur, No.1 Girl Amateur Cruiser and No.1 Girl Pro.
She became ABA No.1 Pro Girl in her rookie year.

Miscellaneous
 By being only 17 years of age in 2008, she missed participation in the 2008 Summer Olympics in Beijing, China due to the 19 years of age minimum to participate by two years. Her first Olympic competition was at the 2012 Summer Olympics in London, England.

BMX press magazine interviews and articles
"Beauty and the Beast" Moto Mag'' January/February 2004 Vol.3 No.1 pg.20

Personal life
Willoughby married Sam Willoughby in 2019.
Brother Nick Post

References

External links
 
 
 
 
 The American Bicycle Association (ABA) Website.
 The National Bicycle League (NBL) Website.
 

1991 births
Living people
American female cyclists
BMX riders
Olympic silver medalists for the United States in cycling
Cyclists at the 2012 Summer Olympics
Cyclists at the 2016 Summer Olympics
Cyclists at the 2020 Summer Olympics
Medalists at the 2016 Summer Olympics
Pan American Games competitors for the United States
Cyclists at the 2015 Pan American Games
21st-century American women